Choice Hotels brands

Quality Inn is an American multinational chain of hotels based in Rockville, Maryland. It is a part of Choice Hotels International family of brands which has operations in more than 40 countries. Quality Inn is the founding brand of Choice Hotels International with more than 1,800 hotels worldwide, as of 2018.

History 
Quality Inn was founded nearly 80 years ago as Quality Courts United, which was the first hotel chain in the United States. By 1946, the association grew to 50 hotels and to 100 hotels by 1952. The group was among the first in the industry to offer wall-to-wall carpeting, daily linen changes, 24-hour desk service and in-room telephones. Stewart Bainum joined the board of directors of Quality Courts in 1961. By 1968, Bainum bthecame the president and chief executive officer of the company and moved its headquarters to Silver Spring, Maryland.  In 1972, Quality Courts was renamed and rebranded to Quality Inn to reflect its growing global presence. By 1990, Quality Inn changed its name to Choice Hotels International and the name Quality Inn became one of several brands under Choice Hotels.

Gallery

See also
 List of hotels
 Choice Hotels

References

Choice Hotels brands